Motile sperm domain containing 3 is a protein that in humans is encoded by the MOSPD3 gene.

Function 

This gene encodes a multi-pass membrane protein with a major sperm protein (MSP) domain. The deletion of a similar mouse gene is associated with defective cardiac development and neonatal lethality. Alternate transcriptional splice variants, encoding different isoforms, have been described.

References

Further reading